Kumarendra Mallick (born 1941) is an Indian geophysicist, poet and a former emeritus scientist at the National Geophysical Research Institute, Hyderabad, A former assistant professor of the Indian Institute of Technology, Mumbai, he served as a director-grade scientist at NGRI. He is the author of three books on geophysics, a poem anthology, Letter to an Imaginary Pen-Friend and several articles.

Biography and career
Mallick, an alumnus of the Indian Institute of Technology, Kharagpur, has served as a visiting professor at University of Naples and as a visiting scientist at University of Karlsruhe. He is reported to have done extensive research on the analysis of geoelectromagnetic data and contributed to the development of interpretational aids. The Council of Scientific and Industrial Research (CSIR), the apex agency of the Government of India for scientific research, awarded him the Shanti Swarup Bhatnagar Prize for Science and Technology, one of the highest Indian science awards for his contributions to Earth, Atmosphere, Ocean and Planetary Sciences in 1986.

Notes

References

Further reading

External links 
 
 

Recipients of the Shanti Swarup Bhatnagar Award in Earth, Atmosphere, Ocean & Planetary Sciences
1941 births
Indian scientific authors
Scientists from Odisha
Indian geochemists
Academic staff of IIT Bombay
IIT Kharagpur alumni
Academic staff of the University of Naples Federico II
Academic staff of the Karlsruhe Institute of Technology
Living people
20th-century Indian earth scientists